Madema is a monotypic moth genus in the subfamily Lymantriinae erected by Paul Griveaud in 1977. Its only species, Madema viettei, was first described by Cyril Leslie Collenette in 1959. It is found on Madagascar.

References

Lymantriini
Monotypic moth genera
Moths of Madagascar